DNA-directed RNA polymerase III subunit RPC6 is an enzyme that in humans is encoded by the POLR3F gene.

Function 

The protein encoded by this gene is one of more than a dozen subunits forming eukaryotic RNA polymerase III (RNA Pol III), which transcribes 5S ribosomal RNA and tRNA genes. This protein has been shown to bind both TFIIIB90 and TBP, two subunits of RNA polymerase III transcription initiation factor IIIB (TFIIIB). Unlike most of the other RNA Pol III subunits, the encoded protein is unique to this polymerase.

Model organisms 

Model organisms have been used in the study of POLR3F function. A conditional knockout mouse line called Polr3ftm1a(EUCOMM)Wtsi was generated at the Wellcome Trust Sanger Institute. Male and female animals underwent a standardized phenotypic screen to determine the effects of deletion. Additional screens performed:  - In-depth immunological phenotyping

References

Further reading